Santos López Pelegrín (1801–1846) was a Spanish journalist and author whose work is associated with Romanticism.

1801 births
1846 deaths
Spanish male dramatists and playwrights
Spanish journalists
19th-century journalists
Male journalists
19th-century Spanish dramatists and playwrights
19th-century male writers